Kingston is an unincorporated community and census designated place (CDP) along the border of South Brunswick Township in Middlesex County and Franklin Township in Somerset County, and also located relatively near Princeton in Mercer County in New Jersey, United States. The historic settlement is in the Raritan Valley region, located along the course of the Millstone River. As of the 2010 United States Census, the CDP's population was 1,493, of which 1,222 were in South Brunswick Township and 271 in Franklin Township.

The New Jersey State Planning Commission created the Kingston Village Advisory Committee in 2001 to address issues related to this distinct area. Both South Brunswick and Franklin appoint members to the committee, which holds an annual meeting to discuss issues pertinent to the Kingston area. Kingston is (so far) unique as the only village center that has been officially designated by the New Jersey State Planning Commission. 

Kingston is located in five historic districts and is part of the Millstone River Valley Scenic Byway. The Delaware and Raritan Canal and Rockingham State Historic Site are a short distance away.

History
Jediah Higgins purchased  from the Native Americans in the early 18th century and the town of Kingston was established. Kingston's location on the Lenape Assunpink Trail where it crossed the Millstone River and later becoming part of the King's Highway was the prime factor in its early prominence. Kingston was by far the most active and important village, being situated on both the heavily traveled King's Road and Millstone River, combining commercial activities of both mills and taverns.

Geography
According to the United States Census Bureau, the CDP had a total area of 2.326 square miles (6.025 km2), of which, 2.238 square miles (5.796 km2) of it was land and 0.088 square miles (0.229 km2) of it (3.80%) was water.

Demographics

Census 2010

Middlesex County portion

Somerset County portion

Census 2000
As of the 2000 United States Census there were 1,292 people, 561 households, and 315 families living in the CDP. The population density was 554.3/km2 (1,440.9/mi2). There were 576 housing units at an average density of 247.1/km2 (642.4/mi2). The racial makeup of the CDP was 74.07% White, 8.05% African American, 0.62% Native American, 10.06% Asian, 4.33% from other races, and 2.86% from two or more races. Hispanic or Latino of any race were 11.69% of the population.

There were 561 households, out of which 24.4% had children under the age of 18 living with them, 44.7% were married couples living together, 8.4% had a female householder with no husband present, and 43.7% were non-families. 36.4% of all households were made up of individuals, and 8.0% had someone living alone who was 65 years of age or older. The average household size was 2.30 and the average family size was 3.08.

In the CDP the population was spread out, with 20.3% under the age of 18, 6.7% from 18 to 24, 36.4% from 25 to 44, 23.1% from 45 to 64, and 13.5% who were 65 years of age or older. The median age was 38 years. For every 100 females, there were 93.4 males. For every 100 females age 18 and over, there were 90.7 males.

The median income for a household in the CDP was $65,962, and the median income for a family was $80,242. Males had a median income of $56,371 versus $46,250 for females. The per capita income for Kingston was $34,457. None of the families and 1.0% of the population were living below the poverty line, including no under eighteens and none of those over 64.

Religion

Kingston Presbyterian Church
The Kingston Presbyterian Church was organized in 1723 and was initially located in a log building adjacent to the Millstone River. The old tombstones surround the site where the church once stood in the Kingston Cemetery. The Reverend Eleazer Wales was the first recorded minister of the church. The original church building in the cemetery burned down in 1791, and new building was erected in 1792 on the original foundation. The congregation used this building until 1852, when the larger building on Main Street in Kingston was constructed on land purchased from Elijah Stout. In 1853, the church building in the cemetery was sold and was later dismantled.  Two additions were constructed on the 1852 site.  Sunday school rooms were added to the back of the structure in the late 1940s.  In the late 1980s another addition was added which added a new kitchen facility, additional space in the assembly room, pastors study and office.

The church suffered through some difficult times during the remainder of the 1700s. During this period, Princeton University was built and the village of Princeton expanded, while the population of Kingston declined. (At that time, Kingston extended as far as Snowden Lane.) Consequently, the church lost many members to the "new" Presbyterian Church down the road in Princeton.

It was also during this time that the Revolutionary War was fought in the area, and British officers were quartered in local homes. Gen. Washington became a recognizable figure in the Kingston area at the time. Not only did he lead his troops past the church to escape Cornwallis, but he also had his headquarters hardly a mile from the church while the Continental Congress sat in Nassau Hall.

In 1800, the Kingston Presbyterian Church began a period of prosperity and growth, which continues to this day. The church sent its first foreign missionaries to China in the early 1800s.

Kingston United Methodist Church
During the month of February 1878, the people of the Methodist Episcopal Church at Rocky Hill brought an evangelist, Miss Lizzie Sharp, to conduct revival meetings in their church. There were some twenty or more of Kingston people who attended these meetings, and who decided to form a Methodist church in Kingston. A site was purchased for $250 on what is now Church Street, across from the Kingston Cemetery. Building began September 20, 1878, and was completed and dedicated on January 30, 1879. A nursery was later added.

National Register of Historic Places
The following sites and districts in Kingston are listed on the National Register of Historic Places:
 Rockingham Historic Site, George Washington's last war-time headquarters in 1783, added in 1970 it is #70000394.
 Delaware and Raritan Canal Historic District was added in 1973, it is district #73001105.
 Kingston Mill Historic District was added in 1986, it is district #86000707.
 Kingston Village Historic District was added in 1990, it is district #89002163.
 King's Highway Historic District was added in 2000, it is district #00001493.
 Princeton Nurseries Historic District, was added in August 2018, it is district #08000899.

Notable people

People who were born in, residents of, or otherwise closely associated with Kingston include:
 Cynthia Gooding (1924–1988), folk singer.
 Andrew Zwicker (born 1964), physicist and member of the New Jersey General Assembly.

References

External links
 Rockingham State Historic Site
 Kingston Greenways Association: http://kingstongreenways.org/
 Friends of Princeton Nursery Lands: http://fpnl.org/
 Kingston Historical Society: http://www.khsnj.org/
 No 92
 Preservation New Jersey: Vanishing Villages
 Kingston Women's Chorus
 
 

Census-designated places in Middlesex County, New Jersey
Census-designated places in Somerset County, New Jersey
Franklin Township, Somerset County, New Jersey
South Brunswick, New Jersey